Muelleromyces is a monotypic genus of fungi in the family Phyllachoraceae. 
It only contains one known species; Muelleromyces indicus .

The genus name of Muelleromyces is in honour of Emil Müller (1920–2008), who was a Swiss mycologist.

The genus was circumscribed by Madhav Narayan Kamat and K.H. Anahosur in Experientia vol.24 on page 849 in 1968.

References

External links
Index Fungorum

Sordariomycetes genera
Phyllachorales